Lawrence is an unincorporated community in Whatcom County, in the U.S. state of Washington.

History
A post office called Lawrence was established in 1892, and remained in operation until 1931. The community derives its name from Laura Blankenship, the daughter of a local businessman.

References

Unincorporated communities in Whatcom County, Washington
Unincorporated communities in Washington (state)